In mathematics, Meier function might refer to:
Kaplan–Meier estimator
Meijer G-function